Sheffield City Council elections took place on May 22, 2014, alongside nationwide local elections and European elections.

There were 29 seats up for election, one third of the council with a double vacancy in Walkley.

With a Labour majority of 36 and defending 19 seats, it was almost mathematically impossible for Labour to lose control of the council, as they would have needed to lose all 19 of those 19 seats to lose control. Even then, Labour would still have been the largest party.

Election result

The Labour Party gained one seat from their position following the 2010 election, but this included a seat already gained from the Liberal Democrats via defection in Walkley. Furthermore, another seat already gained from the Liberal Democrats via defection in Beauchief & Greenhill was regained by the Liberal Democrats.

This result had the following consequences for the total number of seats on the council after the elections:

Defections
Since 2010, when these seats were last contested, two Liberal Democrats had defected to Labour: Ben Curran in Walkley and Clive Skelton in Beauchief & Greenhill. The result in Stocksbridge & Upper Don was notable in that two former Liberal Democrat councillors stood for other parties. Martin Brelsford (defeated in 2011) stood as an Independent, whilst Jack Clarkson (defeated in 2012) stood for UKIP.

Ward results

Arbourthorne

Beauchief & Greenhill

 
 
 
 

 
 
 

 
Beauchief & Greenhill was a regain for the Liberal Democrats, after the sitting councillor had defected to the Labour Party.

Beighton

Birley

Broomhill

Burngreave

Central

Crookes

 
 
 
 
 

 
 

 
Shaffaq Mohammed was a sitting councillor for Broomhill ward.

Darnall

Dore & Totley

East Ecclesfield

Ecclesall

Firth Park

Fulwood

Gleadless Valley

Graves Park

Hillsborough

Manor Castle

Mosborough

Nether Edge

Richmond

Shiregreen & Brightside

Southey

Stannington

Stocksbridge & Upper Don

 
 
 
 
 
 
 
 

 
Jack Clarkson's change in share of the vote is calculated from the UKIP candidate in 2012. His vote increased by 20.2% from his own performance as a Liberal Democrat.

Walkley

 
 
 
 
 
 
 
 
 
 

 
 

 
The result in Walkley did not change the numbers on the council, as the sitting Liberal Democrat councillor had previously defected to Labour.

West Ecclesfield

Woodhouse

References

2014
2014 English local elections
2010s in Sheffield